The South Bank Sky Arts Awards (originally The South Bank Show Awards) are an accolade recognizing British achievements in the arts. The awards have been given annually since 1997.

They originated with the long-running British arts programme The South Bank Show and Melvyn Bragg, who has served as patron, host and master of ceremonies of the awards since their inception. The last South Bank Show Awards ceremony to be broadcast by ITV was in January 2010 and was held at The Dorchester hotel in London. After the network had announced that The South Bank Show would be cancelled at the end of the 2009 season, the awards ceremony continued to be broadcast by Sky Arts and was eventually renamed the South Bank Sky Arts Awards. Sky Arts revived The South Bank Show itself in 2012.

Award categories

In addition to awards in each of the individual categories, the South Bank Sky Arts Awards also include the Outstanding Achievement in the Arts Award recognising lifetime contributions to the arts in Britain, and the Times Breakthrough Award recognising outstanding new British talent. The latter being the only category that is decided by a public vote. Past winners of the Outstanding Achievement in the Arts Award include Julie Walters (2013), Michael Frayn (2012), Dame Judi Dench (2011), JK Rowling (2008), and The Who (2007).

Between 2004 and 2010, the Arts Council England deciBel Award (latterly the Arts Council England Diversity Award) found a home at the ceremony. Winners included Roy Williams for Fallout (2004), Neil Biswas for Bradford Riots (2007), Daljit Nagra for Look We Have Coming To Dover (2008), Street Artist Mohammed Ali (2009), and Julie McNamara (2010).

Later between 2013 and 2016, the ceremony was used as the platform to announce the winners of the Sky Academy Arts Scholarships.

As of the 26th annual ceremony (broadcast July 2022), there were 12 award categories:

2022 awards (26th annual ceremony) 
Shortlisted nominees were announced on 30 June 2022.

2021 awards (25th annual ceremony) 
The 25th annual ceremony marked its return as an in-person event after COVID-19 related restrictions of the previous year with shortlisted nominees announced on 7 June 2021. Two special awards were bestowed this year for innovation in the arts during the pandemic: one for an individual and one for a group / institution.

2020 awards (24th annual ceremony) 
Nominations were revealed on 23 November 2020. Due to COVID-19 restrictions the ceremony itself was a virtual event and took place in the winter instead of its usual summertime slot.

2019 awards (23rd annual ceremony) 
Nominations were revealed on 3 June 2019.

2018 awards (22nd annual ceremony) 
Nominations were revealed on 29 May 2018.

2017 awards (21st annual ceremony) 
Nominations were revealed on 6 June 2017

2016 awards (20th annual ceremony) 
Nominations were revealed on 3 May 2016.

Selected previous winners (1997—2015)

See also

 List of European art awards

References

Arts awards in the United Kingdom
Awards established in 1996
European arts awards